Elmer Lafayette "Bunny" Hearn (January 13, 1904 – March 31, 1974) was a pitcher in Major League Baseball. He played for the Boston Braves.

References

External links

1904 births
1974 deaths
Major League Baseball pitchers
Boston Braves players
Sportspeople from Brooklyn
Baseball players from New York City